Xichang Station is a railway station on the Chengdu–Kunming line, located at No. 6 Yingbin Road, Yuanjiashan Village, Xiaomiao Township, Xichang City, Liangshan Yi Autonomous Prefecture, Sichuan Province, built in 1970, currently a third-class station under the jurisdiction of the Xichang Depot of Chengdu Railway Bureau, with a postal code of 615000. Current passenger transportation: handling passenger boarding and landing; Baggage and parcels are checked in, and freight business is not handled.

Station structure

Station room 
The station building currently used by Xichang Station was built in 1997 and completed on August 5, 1998. Above the ticket gate in the waiting room, there is a 14.6×6-meter mural "Liangshan Love", created by local Yi artist Leso Ag, depicting the grandeur of the Yi Torch Festival.

Standyard 
Xichang Station has 1 main line, 4 arrival and departure lines and 1 freight line, with a side platform and an island platform. There are wooden special lines and overhaul lines on the east side of the Kunming end of the station, and the power supply section and catenary work area on the west side.

References 

Railway stations opened in 1970
Xichang
Infobox mapframe without OSM relation ID on Wikidata
Coordinates on Wikidata

Notes

External links